Taringamotu is a valley and rural community in the Ruapehu District and Manawatū-Whanganui region of New Zealand's North Island.

It is located northwest of Taumarunui, and north of State Highway 41.

The local Hia Kaitupeka marae is a tribal meeting ground of the Ngāti Maniapoto hapū of Hari and Te Kanawa, and the Ngāti Hāua hapū of Ngāti Hira. It includes the Hari meeting house.

Education

See also 

 Taringamotu railway station
 Taringamotu Tramway

References

Populated places in Manawatū-Whanganui
Ruapehu District